Maurice Simon may refer to;

 Maurice Simon (official) (1892–1960), Belgian colonial administrator
 Maurice James Simon  (1929–2019), American jazz saxophonist